The arcuate line of rectus sheath, the arcuate line, or the semicircular line of Douglas, is a horizontal line that demarcates the lower limit of the posterior layer of the rectus sheath. It is commonly known simply as the arcuate line. It is also where the inferior epigastric artery and vein perforate the rectus abdominis.

Structure 
Superior to the arcuate line, the internal oblique muscle aponeurosis splits to envelop the rectus abdominis muscle both anteriorly and posteriorly. The anterior layer is derived from the external oblique aponeurosis and the anterior lamina of the internal oblique aponeurosis. The posterior layer is made up of the posterior lamina of the internal oblique aponeurosis and the transversus abdominis aponeurosis.

Inferior to the arcuate line, the aponeuroses of the external oblique muscle, the internal oblique muscle, and the transversus abdominis muscle merge and pass superficial to the rectus abdominis muscle. Therefore, inferior to the arcuate line, the rectus abdominis rests directly on the transversalis fascia.

The arcuate line occurs about half of the distance from the umbilicus to the pubic crest, but this varies from person to person.

If one dissects the anterolateral abdominal wall, the arcuate line may be difficult to see, since all the aponeuroses are translucent.

Clinical significance 
Spigelian hernias and, exceedingly rarely, arcuate line hernias may occur inferior to the arcuate line.

The arcuate line must be incised at its lateral-most point in order to enter the space of Retzius and space of Bogros from within the rectus sheath during surgery during retrorectus repair and transversus abdominis release.

History 
The arcuate line is also known as the linea semicircularis, and the semicircular line of Douglas.

References

External links
  - "Anterior Abdominal Wall: The Posterior Wall of the Rectus Sheath"
 
 
 
 
  - "Anterior Abdominal Wall, Lower Part, Posterior View"

Abdomen